Mary, Marry Me is a 2018 Philippine romantic comedy film directed by RC Delos Reyes and starring Toni Gonzaga, Alex Gonzaga, and Sam Milby. It marks the first film to star the Gonzaga sisters, and the reunion project between Toni Gonzaga and Sam Milby, who starred in 2009's Ang Tanging Pamilya: A Marry Go Round. Mary, Marry Me was released on December 25, 2018, as an official entry to the 2018 Metro Manila Film Festival.

Cast

Main cast
 Toni Gonzaga-Soriano as Mary Jane "MJ" Lagman
Sharlene San Pedro as young Mary Jane
 Alex Gonzaga as Mary Anne "MA" Lagman
 Xyriel Manabat  as young Mary Anne
 Sam Milby as Peter "Pete" Cummings
  Jairus Aquino as young Pete

Supporting cast
 Bayani Agbayani as Gardo
 Melai Cantiveros as Carey
 Moi Bien as Verna
 Rubi Rubi as Toyang
 Fabio Ide as Matt
 Yayo Aguila as Beth Lagman
 Allan Paule as Ruben Lagman
 Milo Elmido as Caramel
 Jade Soberano as Honey
 Divine Aucina as Jessica
 Rufa Mae Quinto as Pichie
 Crisanta Gonzaga (cameo)
 Seve Soriano (cameo)

Release

 Philippines
 December 25, 2018
 Worldwide
 January 7, 2019
 KBO Channel
February 16–17, 2019
KBO on TFC and TFC.TV

References

External links
 

2018 films
2010s Tagalog-language films
Philippine romantic comedy films
Films about weddings
2018 romantic comedy films
2010s English-language films